Dambar Shah (?–1645) was the king of the Gorkha Kingdom, present-day Gorkha District, Nepal. He was the father of Krishna Shah.

References

Gurkhas
1645 deaths
People from Gorkha District
17th-century Nepalese people
Year of birth missing
Nepalese Hindus